George Leonardos (born 1937) is a Greek author of historical novels.

Early life 

Son of Anastase and Maria, Leonardos was born in Alexandria, Egypt on 20 February 1937. His father died when he was two years old and he lived with his mother in Alexandria until 1954. He was an avid reader of fiction and history, and as a high school student in Alexandria had his short stories published in Tachydromos and Anatoli, the Greek daily newspapers of the city. In 1954 he moved to Greece to study physics at the Aristotle University of Thessaloniki.

Career 

After his graduation, he studied journalism and began to work as a journalist. He worked as a reporter for Athens newspapers Apogevmatini, Eleftherotypia, Mesimvrini, Eleftheros Typos, Ethnos and as a columnist in the financial paper Kerdos. He was the first correspondent of the Athens News Agency in Belgrade in 1964, and later in New York City in 1976, where he was also appointed director of the local Greek newspaper Ethnicos Kirikas. He has also worked as a newscaster in Greek Radio and Television, and has reported on the Vietnam War and the Persian Gulf war.

Leonardos is a member of the Athens Association of Daily Press Editors and the National Society of Greek Writers. His first novel, Grandma’s Red Sofa, was published in 1992. He was twice awarded the prize for best historical novel by the Greek Society of Christian Studies for his novels Mara, the Christian Sultana and Sleeping Beauty of Mystra. He was awarded a Botsis Foundation prize for his services to journalism and literature.

In 2008 he was awarded with the Greek State Prize for his historical trilogy The Palaeologian Dynasty. The Rise and Fall of Byzantium and specially for the third historical novel of the mentioned trilogy "The Last Palaeologue".

In 1980 he published the English-Greek Dictionary of Scientific and Military Terms, and in 2000 he published The Structure of the Novel. His latest historical novel is Sophia Paleologue Palaelogina – From Byzantium to Russia.

Works

Novels 
 Grandmam's red sofa, 1992
 The house over the catacombs, 1993
 Eva, 1994
 The magnet poles, 1995
 Earth's lovers, 1996
 A song from the soul, 1997

Historical novels 
 Barbarossa the Pirate, 1998
 Mara, the Christian Sultana, 1999
 Maria Magdalene, 2001
 Sleeping Beauty of Mystra, 2002
 Michael VIII Palaeologue, 2004
 The Palaeologues, 2006
 The last Palaeologue, 2007.
 Sophia Paleologue – From Byzantium to Russia, 2008
 Magellan,2009
 Thule 2010
 The Alexandria Rhapsody 2011
 The Last Sip of Wine 2013
 Islands Forgotten by the Time - Don Teodoro Griego, 2014
 Justinian ii;-The slit-nosed, 2016
 The Sarantapichena;- The story of Irene the Athenian, 2016

References 

National Book Center of Greece
TO VIMA
TA NEA
Award of Botsis Foundation
Who's Who (1979) p. 363
Who's Who Metron (1995) p. 452
European Who's Who (2002–2003) p. 1047

External links 
 George Leonardos' official website

Living people
Egyptian emigrants to Greece
Greek historical novelists
Writers of historical fiction set in the Middle Ages
1937 births
Writers from Alexandria
Maritime writers
Egyptian people of Greek descent